Codex Sangallensis, designated by Δ or 037 (in the Gregory-Aland numbering of New Testament manuscripts), ε76 (in the von Soden numbering of New Testament manuscripts), is a Greek-Latin diglot uncial manuscript of the four Gospels. Using the study of comparative writing styles (palaeography), it is usually dated to the 9th century CE, though a few palaeographers would place it in the 10th century CE. It was given its current name by biblical scholar Johann Martin Augustin Scholz in 1830.

The Latin text is written above the Greek text, interlinear style.

Description 

The manuscript is a codex (precursor to the modern book), containing a near complete text of the four Gospels on 198 parchment leaves (size ), with one missing section: John 19:17-35. The text is written in one column per page, 17-28 lines per page, in large semi-uncial letters using brown and black ink.  The Latin text is written above the Greek (as in Codex Boernerianus), and in minuscule letters. It is decorated, but the decorations were made by an inartistic hand. The manuscript from which Sangallensis was copied (known as its Vorlage/examplar) was likely written stichometrically. Quotations from the Old Testament are indicated.

The text is divided according to Ammonian Sections, whose numbers are given at the margin, with references to the Eusebian Canons (both early systems of dividing the four Gospels into different sections) in Roman letters written below the Ammonian Section numbers. It contains Prologues, the Epistle of Jerome to Pope Damasus I (a letter outlining Jerome's Latin translation of the Gospels), the Eusebian Canon Tables, and the tables of contents (known as  / kephalaia) before each gospel in both Greek and Latin. Brief subscriptions are written after each gospel.

The Pericope Adulterae (John 7:53-8:11) is omitted, but a blank space was left for the remainder of the 348th page. The texts of Matthew 16:2b-3 and John 5:4 are included without any indications of spuriousness, but Luke 22:43 is marked by asterisks to express doubt as to its inclusion.

Text 

The Greek text is considered a representative of the Alexandrian text-type (similar to L) in the Gospel of Mark, but the Byzantine text-type in the rest of the gospels (as in Ψ). The text-types are groups of different New Testament manuscripts which share specific or generally related readings, which then differ from each other group, and thus the conflicting readings can separate out the groups. These are then used to determine the original text as published; there are three main groups with names: Alexandrian, Western, and Byzantine. Biblical scholar Kurt Aland placed it in Category III of his New Testament manuscript classification system. Category III manuscripts are described as having "a small but not a negligible proportion of early readings, with a considerable encroachment of [Byzantine] readings, and significant readings from other sources as yet unidentified." 

 Some Textual variants

 - Δ
 - All other witnesses

 - Δ Θ 0250 ƒ ƒ 537 1424
omit - All other witnesses

  (the love of wealth) - Δ
 - D Θ 565 it
 - W 1424 f
 - All other witnesses

 – Δ B L W ƒ ƒ 28 565 700 ℓ 260 syr sa
 – All other witnesses

 (Then, having looked) - Δ  Θ ƒ 33 892 1241. 1424 pm pc
 (Having looked) -   A B K L Γ Ψ ƒ 565 579 700 pm

Latin text 
The Latin version seems a mixture of the Vulgate with Old Latin Itala, and altered and accommodated to the Greek as to be of little critical value.

The interlinear Latin text of the codex is remarkable for its alternative readings in almost every verse, e.g. uxorem vel coniugem for την γυναικα in Matthew 1:20.

History 
The codex was written in the West, possibly in the St. Gallen monastery, by an Irish monk in the 9th century. It can not be dated earlier, because it has a reference to the (heretical) opinions of Gottschalk at Luke 13:24 and John 12:40.

Siglum Δ was given to it by Scholz.

It was examined by Martin Gerbert (1773), Scholz, Rettig, J. Rendel Harris, Oscar von Gebhardt. Rettig thought that Codex Sangallensis is a part of the same manuscript as Codex Boernerianus.

The text of the codex was edited by H. C. M. Rettig in 1836, but with some mistakes (e.g. in Luke 21:32 οφθαλμους instead of αδελφους). There are references made to the opinions of Gottschalk († 866) in Luke 13:24; John 12:40, and to Hand Aragon (†  941).

The codex is located in the Abbey library of St. Gallen (48) at St. Gallen.

Gallery

See also 

 List of New Testament Latin manuscripts
 List of New Testament uncials
 Textual criticism

References

Further reading 
 H. C. M. Rettig, Antiquissimus quattuor evangeliorum canonicorum Codex Sangallensis Graeco-Latinus intertlinearis, Quart., (Zurich, 1836), p. LIV, 429. 
 H. C. M. Rettig, Ueber einen tausendjährigen noch nie verglichenen griechischen Evangeliencodex mit lateinischer Interlinearversion, Theologische Studien und Kritiken (1836), pp. 465–469. 
 Gustav Scherrer, Verzeichniss der Handschriften der Stiftsbibliothel. von St. Gallen …, (Halle, 1875). 
 J. Rendel Harris, The Codex Sangallensis (Δ). A Study in the Text of the Old Latin Gospels, (London, 1891).

External links 

 
 Codex Sangallensis Δ (037): at the Encyclopedia of Textual Criticism 
 Codex Sangallensis 48 images of the codex at the CSNTM.
 Codex Sangallensis 48 images of the codex at the Stiffsbibliothek St. Gallen

Greek New Testament uncials
Vetus Latina New Testament manuscripts
9th-century biblical manuscripts
Manuscripts of the Abbey library of Saint Gall
Vulgate manuscripts